Max Reichenberger (born 24 January 1948) is a retired German football defender and later manager.

He is the father of Thomas Reichenberger.

References

1948 births
Living people
German footballers
TSV 1860 Munich players
Eintracht Bad Kreuznach players
Association football defenders
Bundesliga players
2. Bundesliga players
German football managers
SV Wehen Wiesbaden managers
SV Darmstadt 98 managers
Wormatia Worms managers